Springfields Fun Park is a small theme park in Cornwall, England, United Kingdom. It is situated just over one mile south of St Columb Major and advertises itself as Springfields Fun Park and Pony Centre.

External links

Official website

Amusement parks in England
Springfields Fun Park